Michael DeLong (born June 10, 1952) is a former American football player and coach. He served as the head football coach at Maine Maritime Academy from 1979 to 1980 and at Springfield College in Springfield, Massachusetts from 1984 to 2015, compiling a career college football coaching record of 201–139–2. DeLong played college football at Springfield as a defensive lineman in the early 1970s before graduating in 1974. He returned to his alma mater in 1981 as an assistant coach.

Head coaching record

College

See also
 List of college football coaches with 200 wins

References

External links
 Springfield profile

1952 births
Living people
American football defensive linemen
Maine Maritime Mariners football coaches
North Carolina Tar Heels football coaches
Springfield Pride football coaches
Springfield Pride football players
High school football coaches in New York (state)
University of North Carolina at Chapel Hill alumni
People from Oneida County, New York
Players of American football from New York (state)